The following is a list of stadiums in the European League of Football.

Current stadiums

Former Stadiums

See also 

 List of current National Football League stadiums
 List of Canadian Football League stadiums

Lists of stadiums
European League of Football venues